Rachelle Viinberg  (née De Jong, born April 30, 1979) is a retired Canadian Olympic rower and anaturopathic doctor who currently resides in Toronto, Ontario. She was a member of the 2004, 2008, and 2012 Canadian Olympic Rowing teams. In 2012, she won her first Olympic medal, a silver, in the Women's Eight. Her team were beaten by Team USA by just 1.4 seconds.

Early life
Viinberg was born in Nanaimo, British Columbia, located on Vancouver Island. She has an older brother named Simon. Her mother, June de Jong (née Mayhew) is an actress. Her father, Hielke de Jong, who died December 7, 2009, was a retired government employee. Viinberg's ancestry includes Dutch, English, and Ukrainian.

At the age of eight, Viinberg and her family moved to Regina, Saskatchewan. She attended Argyle Elementary school and graduated from Sheldon Williams Collegiate in 1997. Viinberg wasn't always a rower. From the moment she saw Calgary Olympian Mark Tewksbury win the 100-metre backstroke at the 1992 Barcelona Olympics, she aspired to be a swimmer. Once adolescence hit at 13, however, Viinberg underwent a massive growth spurt, preventing her from pursuing the sport much further.

Ultimately, it was Viinberg's parents who introduced her to rowing. “They helped me discover rowing after seeing all the rowers train every morning on Wascana Lake when they drove to work. I thought I had nothing to lose, and my 6’0 frame seemed to be the ideal body type,” said Viinberg.

Olympics
In 2004 Viinberg made her first Olympic team in Athens, Greece. In 2008 Viinberg was selected to compete in the Women's Quad at the Beijing Olympic Games. When one of the members of the crew was suffering with a rib fracture, the team achieved an eighth-place finish.

Personal life
Viinberg married her husband, Alex, in 2009 after meeting in 2005. He proposed on the Great Wall of China after the 2008 Olympic Games. She attributes much of her success to his support.

In 2009 Viinberg's father died from Leukemia. Eighteen months later, her mother was diagnosed with Stage 3C colon cancer. When asked about her mom after the race, she replied, "She battled stage three colon cancer so she could be in the stands to watch me perform my dream. We both achieved our goals."

Key results
 2012 – 2nd in the W8+, Olympic Games, London, GBR
 2012 – 1st in the W8+, World Cup, Munich, Germany
 2012 – 2nd in the W8+, World Cup, Lucerne, Switzerland
 2011 – 2nd in the W8+, World Championship, Bled, Slovenia
 2011 – 2nd in the W8+, World Cup, Lucerne, Switzerland
 2010 – 2nd in the W8+, World Rowing Championships, New Zealand
 2008 – 8th in the Olympic quad, Beijing, China
 2007 – 5th in the W4x, World Championships, Munich, Germany
 2006 – 7th in the W4x, World Championships, Eton, England
 2004 – Alternate on Olympic team in Athens, Greece
 2003 – 4th in the W4-, World Championships, Milan, Italy
 2002 – 2nd in the W4-, World Championships, Seville, Spain
 2002 – 6th in the W8+, World Championships, Seville, Spain
 2002 – 4th in the W8+, World Cup, Munich, Germany
 2001 – 2nd in the W2-, US Nationals, Camden, New Jersey
 2000 – 1st in the W8+, Women's Henley, Henley-on-Thames, England
 2000 – 2nd in the W8+, Henley Royal Regatta, Henley-on-Thames, England
 1997 – 1st in the W4- and 2nd in the W8+, Jeux Canada Games, Brandon, Manitoba

References

External links 
 Rowing Canada Results Record

1979 births
Living people
Olympic rowers of Canada
Rowers at the 2008 Summer Olympics
Rowers at the 2012 Summer Olympics
Canadian people of Dutch descent
Olympic silver medalists for Canada
Olympic medalists in rowing
Canadian female rowers
Medalists at the 2012 Summer Olympics
Canadian people of English descent
Canadian people of Ukrainian descent
Sportspeople from Nanaimo
University of Victoria alumni
Naturopaths
World Rowing Championships medalists for Canada